George William Layton (28 June 1882–1946) was an English footballer who played in the Football League for Wolverhampton Wanderers.

References

1882 births
1946 deaths
English footballers
Association football forwards
English Football League players
Shrewsbury Town F.C. players
Wolverhampton Wanderers F.C. players
Coventry City F.C. players